Goose barnacles, also called stalked barnacles or gooseneck barnacles, are filter-feeding crustaceans that live attached to hard surfaces of rocks and flotsam in the ocean intertidal zone. Goose barnacles formerly made up the taxonomic order Pedunculata, but research has resulted in the classification of stalked barnacles within multiple orders of the infraclass Thoracica.

Biology 

Some species of goose barnacles such as Lepas anatifera are pelagic and are most frequently found on tidewrack on oceanic coasts. Unlike most other types of barnacles, intertidal goose barnacles (e.g. Pollicipes pollicipes and Pollicipes polymerus) depend on water motion rather than the movement of their cirri for feeding, and are therefore found only on exposed or moderately exposed coasts.

Spontaneous generation 

In the days before it was realised that birds migrate, it was thought that barnacle geese, Branta leucopsis, developed from this crustacean through spontaneous generation, since they were never seen to nest in temperate Europe, hence the English names "goose barnacle", "barnacle goose" and the scientific name Lepas anserifera ("goose"). The confusion was prompted by the similarities in colour and shape. Because they were often found on driftwood, it was assumed that the barnacles were attached to branches before they fell in the water. The archdeacon of Brecon, Gerald of Wales, made this claim in his Topographia Hiberniae.

Since barnacle geese were thought to be "neither flesh, nor born of flesh", they were allowed to be eaten on days when eating meat was forbidden by Christianity, though it was not universally accepted. The Holy Roman Emperor Frederick II examined barnacles and noted no evidence of any bird-like embryo in them, and the secretary of Leo of Rozmital wrote a very skeptical account of his reaction to being served the goose at a fast-day dinner in 1456.

One component of L. anatifera that continues to be researched today is the adhesive properties of the barnacle. Following an observational study regarding the adhesive properties of Goose Barnacle (L. anatifera), it was found that the adhesive gland cells of L. anatifera were located inside the muscle layer on the back side of the main stalk (peduncle). These glands secrete protein based adhesive to make it possible to attach the barnacles to fixed or mobile items/entities. This research in the barnacle adhesive serves as inspiration to the healthcare community to conduct their own research in an attempt to improve medical adhesive.

As food

In Portugal and Spain, the species Pollicipes pollicipes is a widely consumed and expensive delicacy known as percebes. Percebes are harvested commercially in the Iberian northern coast, mainly in Galicia and Asturias, but also in the Southwestern Portuguese coast (Alentejo)  and are also imported from other countries within its range of distribution, particularly from Morocco. A larger but less palatable species (Pollicipes polymerus) was also imported to Spain from Canada until 1999, when the Canadian government ceased exports due to depletion of stocks.

In Spain, percebes are lightly boiled in brine and served whole and hot under a napkin. To eat percebes, the diamond shaped foot is pinched between thumb and finger and the inner tube pulled out of the scaly case. The claw is removed and the remaining flesh is swallowed.
Historically, the indigenous peoples of California used to eat the stem after cooking it in hot ashes.

References 

Jonker, J.L., Morrison, L., Lynch, E.P., Grunwald, I., Von Byern, J., 
    & Power A.M. (2015). The Chemistry of Stalked Barnacle Adhesive 
    (Lepas anatifera). Interface focus 5. 
    http://dx.dpi.org/10.1098/rsfs.2014.0062

Flammang, P., Jonker, J.L., Waltraud, K., Power, A.M., & Von Byern, J. 
    (2012). Unusual adhesive production system in the barnacle Lepas 
    anatifera: An ultrastructural and histochemical investigation. 
    Journal of Morphology. https://doi.org/10.1002/jmor.20067

Machado, A.M., Sarropoulou, E., Castro, F.C., Vasconcelos, V., & Cunha, 
    I. (2018). An important resource for understanding bio-adhesion 
    mechanisms: Cement T gland transcriptomes of two goose barnacles, 
    Pollicipes pollicipes and Lepas anatifera (Cirripedia, Thoracica). 
    Interdisciplinary Centre of Marine and Environmental Research. 
    https://doi.org/10.1016/j.margen.2018.11.001

External links 
 
 

Barnacles
Edible crustaceans
Seafood in Native American cuisine
Arthropod common names